Abohimiadana is a rural town in Analamanga Region, in the  Central Highlands of Madagascar. It belongs to the district of Andramasina and its populations numbers to 23,320 in 2018.

References

External links

Populated places in Analamanga